In mathematics, Bernstein inequality, named after Sergei Natanovich Bernstein, may refer to:

 Bernstein's inequality (mathematical analysis)
 Bernstein inequalities (probability theory)

Mathematics disambiguation pages